Tearbritches Creek is a stream in the U.S. state of Georgia. It is a tributary to the Conasauga River.

Tearbritches Creek was so named on account of the thick brush which lines its banks.

References

Rivers of Georgia (U.S. state)
Rivers of Fannin County, Georgia
Rivers of Murray County, Georgia